The Tai'an railway station is a high-speed railway station in Daiyue District, Tai'an, Shandong, People's Republic of China. It is served by the Jinghu High-Speed Railway.

Railway stations in Shandong
Railway stations in China opened in 2011